This is a list of airports in North Macedonia, grouped by type and sorted by location.



Airports 

Airport names shown in bold indicate the facility has scheduled passenger service on commercial airlines.

See also 
 Transport in North Macedonia
 List of airports by ICAO code: L#LW – North Macedonia
 Wikipedia: WikiProject Aviation/Airline destination lists: Europe#North Macedonia

References 
 
 
  – includes IATA codes
  – ICAO codes
  – IATA and ICAO codes

North Macedonia
 
Airports
Airports
North Macedonia